Events in the year 1910 in Germany.

Incumbents

National level
 Kaiser – Wilhelm II
 Chancellor – Theobald von Bethmann Hollweg

State level

Kingdoms
 King of Bavaria – Otto of Bavaria
 King of Prussia – Kaiser Wilhelm II
 King of Saxony – Frederick Augustus III of Saxony
 King of Württemberg – William II of Württemberg

Grand Duchies
 Grand Duke of Baden – Frederick II
 Grand Duke of Hesse – Ernest Louis
 Grand Duke of Mecklenburg-Schwerin – Frederick Francis IV
 Grand Duke of Mecklenburg-Strelitz – Adolphus Frederick V
 Grand Duke of Oldenburg – Frederick Augustus II
 Grand Duke of Saxe-Weimar-Eisenach – William Ernest

Principalities
 Schaumburg-Lippe – George, Prince of Schaumburg-Lippe
 Schwarzburg-Rudolstadt – Günther Victor, Prince of Schwarzburg
 Schwarzburg-Sondershausen – Günther Victor, Prince of Schwarzburg
 Principality of Lippe – Leopold IV, Prince of Lippe
 Reuss Elder Line – Heinrich XXIV, Prince Reuss of Greiz (with Heinrich XIV, Prince Reuss Younger Line as regent)
 Reuss Younger Line – Heinrich XIV, Prince Reuss Younger Line
 Waldeck and Pyrmont – Friedrich, Prince of Waldeck and Pyrmont

Duchies
 Duke of Anhalt – Frederick II, Duke of Anhalt
 Duke of Brunswick – Duke John Albert of Mecklenburg (regent)
 Duke of Saxe-Altenburg – Ernst II, Duke of Saxe-Altenburg
 Duke of Saxe-Coburg and Gotha – Charles Edward, Duke of Saxe-Coburg and Gotha
 Duke of Saxe-Meiningen – Georg II, Duke of Saxe-Meiningen

Colonial Governors
 Cameroon (Kamerun) – Theodor Seitz (4th and final term) to 27 August, then Theodor Steinhausen (acting governor) to September, then Wilhelm Peter Hansen (acting governor) to 25 October, then Otto Gleim (3rd and final term)
 Kiaochow (Kiautschou) – Oskar von Truppel
 German East Africa (Deutsch-Ostafrika) – Georg Albrecht Freiherr von Rechenberg
 German New Guinea (Deutsch-Neuguinea) – Albert Hahl (2nd term)
 German Samoa (Deutsch-Samoa) – Wilhelm Solf
 German South-West Africa (Deutsch-Südwestafrika) – Bruno von Schuckmann to 20 June, then Theodor Seitz from 28 August
 Togoland – Johann Nepomuk Graf Zech auf Neuhofen to 7 November, then vacant

Events
 22 June – The DELAG Zeppelin dirigible, Deutschland, makes the first commercial passenger flight from Friedrichshafen to Düsseldorf in Germany. The flight takes nine hours.
 16 August – Berliner FV, German association football club founded.

Births
 20 February – Rudolf Beckmann, SS officer (died 1943)
 22 June – Herbert Quandt, German industrialist (died 1982)
 1 August – Gerda Taro, Polish-German war photographer (died 1937)
 11 September – Gerhard Schröder, politician (died 1989)
 18 September – Josef Tal, German-born Israeli composer (died 2008)
 8 October – Helmut Kallmeyer, chemist and Action T4 perpetrator (died 2006)
 6 November – Erik Ode, German actor (died 1983)
 Date unknown – Yaakov Ben-Tor, German-born Israeli geologist (died 2002)

Deaths
 10 March – Carl Reinecke, German composer, conductor and pianist (born 1824)
 7 May – Bernhard Cossmann, German cellist (born 1822)
 27 May – Robert Koch, German physician, Nobel Prize laureate (born 1843)
 10 July – Johann Gottfried Galle, German astronomer (born 1812)
 26 August – Friedrich Daniel von Recklinghausen, pathologist (born 1833)
 15 November – Wilhelm Raabe, German writer (born 1831)
 19 November – Wilhelm Rudolph Fittig, German chemist (born 1835)

References

 
Years of the 20th century in Germany
Germany
Germany